Joseph Vloeberghs (15 November 1935 – 21 May 1992) was a Belgian racing cyclist. He rode in the 1961 Tour de France.

References

External links
 

1935 births
1992 deaths
Belgian male cyclists
Place of birth missing
Tour de Suisse stage winners